The Filbasket International Championship, also known as the Sportsclick Filbasket International Championship – Malaysia  for sponsorship reasons, was the third tournament under the Philippine-based  Filbasket league. The tournament was held in Kuala Lumpur, Malaysia.

The tournament was organized in coordination with the Samahang Basketbol ng Pilipinas and the Malaysia Basketball Association.

The Malaysia national team, playing as "Harimau Malaysia", clinched the title by beating fellow Malaysian team KL Aseel in the final.

Teams

Elimination round

Group A

Group B

Playoff bracket 
The top two teams from the elimination round will play in the semifinals. The winners will advance for a one-game final while the losers will contest in the third place play-off game.

Semifinals

Third place game

Final

References

2022–23 in Philippine basketball leagues
2022 in Philippine sport
October 2022 sports events in Malaysia
2022–23 in Asian basketball leagues
2022, International